Simon Oates (6 January 1932 – 20 May 2009) was an English actor best known for his roles on television.

Born in Canning Town, east London and moving to Finchley in his teens, Oates trained as a heating engineer for his father's firm before becoming an actor. He was in the Intelligence Corps during his Army National Service. Working in theatrical rep during the 1950s he was leading man at York Theatre Royal for some years before being cast as Dr. John Ridge in the science fiction television series Doomwatch. (Co-stars included John Paul as Dr. Spencer Quist and Robert Powell as Toby Wren). He appeared regularly as Anthony Kelly in the 1960s espionage series The Mask of Janus and its spin-off series The Spies.

His many guest appearances included: The Avengers, Man in a Suitcase, Department S, Jason King, The New Avengers, The Professionals, Bergerac and The 10 Percenters.

His film appearances were few but included Night Train to Paris (1964), the British sci-fi film The Terrornauts (1967), and the film version of Doomwatch (1972). He appeared as John Steed in the 1971 stage adaptation of The Avengers with Sue Lloyd and Kate O'Mara. He also appeared in the West End in the Francis Durbridge thriller Suddenly at Home. He worked extensively in theatre in Great Britain, the West End and indeed, the world throughout his career, both as an actor and a director, and lived in Canada for some time where he had a touring theatre company.

His son, Justin Brett, also an actor, said that his father was offered the role of James Bond in Diamonds Are Forever, but that Sean Connery changed his mind and returned to the role. Other sources suggest that Oates was in the running before Roger Moore was confirmed as 007 for Live and Let Die.

In tandem with his straight acting career, Simon also appeared many times as a stand-up comic and compere, working with such stars as Tom Jones, Sandie Shaw and the Who. He also appeared at the London Palladium with Dorothy Squires. He directed Woman in a Dressing Gown, starring Brenda Bruce at the Vaudeville Theatre. He also directed many musicals and straight plays on the touring circuit.

Simon died on Wednesday 20 May 2009, following a protracted illness.

References

External links 
 
 Obituary in The Times
 Obituary in The Independent

1932 births
2009 deaths
English male television actors
English male stage actors
People from Canning Town